Fallicambarus petilicarpus, the slenderwrist burrowing crayfish, is a species of crayfish in the family Cambaridae. It is found in southern Arkansas and northern Louisiana.

The IUCN conservation status of Fallicambarus petilicarpus is "EN", endangered. The species faces a high risk of extinction in the near future. The IUCN status was reviewed in 2010.

References

Further reading

 
 
 

Cambaridae
Articles created by Qbugbot
Crustaceans described in 1989
Taxa named by Horton H. Hobbs Jr.